Delhi Public School, Faridabad is a School in Sector 19, Faridabad, Haryana, India founded on 10 July 1995.

History
DPS Faridabad was founded by Shri U.S. Verma in 1995 at Sector 19, Faridabad.

Infrastructure
DPS Faridabad covers an area of 8 acres (32,000 m2) and includes a hostel, a playing field, a canteen, an open-air theatre, gardens, and a school building.
The School has a SIS (student information system) Department for effective digital information and communication.
The school has installed a solar power plant on its rooftop to meet all of its power requirements and even supplies electricity to the Haryana Government.

The school currently enrolls over 4000 students as day scholars and hostelers and conducts classes from preschool to senior secondary level.

It also conducts a social responsibility programme called DPS Shiksha Kendra for underprivileged children, providing them with equipment such as books, stationery and uniforms as well as education. It is managed by Delhi Public School Society.

The school has tie-up with Bangalore-based company for their app Northstar to ensure child safety by tracking their movement to and from school. All transports are highly equipped with CCTV cameras for surveillance.

Sports
DPS Faridabad participates in regional athletics competitions.

Notable alumni	
Rahul Dalal, India cricketer 
Ajey Nagar, Indian Youtuber.

Court case
Delhi Public School, Faridabad vs State of Haryana and Others on 22 April 2015 resulted in the reinstatement of the falsely charged principal Anil Kumar after a period of 8 years.

References

External links
 Official website

Delhi Public School Society
Schools in Faridabad
Educational institutions established in 1995
1995 establishments in Haryana